Ambrose Thomas (21 June 1880 – 11 December 1959), alias Amand Edouard Ambroise Marie Lowis Etienne Phillipe d'Sant Andre Tournay, Marquis d'Oisy was an English artist. After a period as an Anglican Benedictine monk under Aelred Carlyle on Caldey Island, Thomas worked as a designer for the vestment-design firm of Louis Grossé. He moved in 1917 to Pledgdon Green, where he died after a career in which he received several commissions by Conrad Noel for work in the parish church at Thaxted.

References
 Julian W. S. Litten, The Marquis d'Oisy: Aesthete, Exotic and Enigma (London: Anglo Catholic History Society, 2013).
 Saffron Walden Historical Journal, Autumn 2012

1880 births
1959 deaths
English artists